Raúl Garrido Fernández (born 20 October 1972) is a Spanish retired footballer who played as a midfielder, and the current manager of CD Eldense.

External links

Soccerway profile

1972 births
Living people
Footballers from Valencia (city)
Spanish footballers
Association football midfielders
Segunda División players
Segunda División B players
Tercera División players
Valencia CF Mestalla footballers
FC Andorra players
Real Murcia players
Gimnàstic de Tarragona footballers
UE Lleida players
Benidorm CF footballers
Spanish football managers
Huracán Valencia CF managers
CD Eldense managers
UE Olot managers
Expatriate footballers in Andorra
Spanish expatriate footballers
Spanish expatriate sportspeople in Andorra